Peter Becker is a German molecular biologist. 
He studied biology at the Ruprecht Karl University of Heidelberg until 1984 and finished his Ph.D at the German Cancer Research Center and the Ruprecht Karl University of Heidelberg in 1987.
After being employed at the European Molecular Biology Laboratory from 1991 until 1999 he became head of the Adolf Butenandt Institute for molecular biology at the Ludwig Maximilian University of Munich.

In 2005, he received the Gottfried Wilhelm Leibniz Prize of the Deutsche Forschungsgemeinschaft, which is the highest honour awarded in German research. In 2007 he became a member of the German Academy of Sciences Leopoldina.

References 

 Porträt at the Deutsche Forschungsgesellschaft

Living people
German molecular biologists
Science teachers
Gottfried Wilhelm Leibniz Prize winners
1958 births
Members of the German Academy of Sciences Leopoldina